Rewaya may refer to:

 Revaya, a settlement in Israel
 Riwaya, a chain of transmission of Quranic qiraʼat